Mamor Niang (born 4 February 2002) is a Spanish professional footballer who plays as a forward for Real Avilés CF.

Club career
Born in Móstoles, Community of Madrid to a Senegalese family, Niang joined Getafe CF's youth setup in 2018, after representing AD Alcorcón and EF Ciudad de Getafe. He made his senior debut with the former's reserves on 6 December 2020, coming on as a second-half substitute in a 1–2 Segunda División B home loss against UD San Sebastián de los Reyes.

Niang made his first team debut on 5 January 2021, starting in a 0–1 away loss against Córdoba CF, for the season's Copa del Rey. His La Liga debut occurred twenty days later, as he replaced Takefusa Kubo in a 1–5 loss at Athletic Bilbao.

On 23 February 2022, after losing space in the B-side, Niang moved to Segunda División RFEF side Real Avilés CF.

References

External links
 
 
 

2002 births
Living people
People from Móstoles
Spanish people of Senegalese descent
Spanish footballers
Footballers from the Community of Madrid
Association football forwards
La Liga players
Segunda División B players
Segunda Federación players
Tercera Federación players
Getafe CF B players
Getafe CF footballers
Real Avilés CF managers